Paphinia, abbreviated in horticultural trade Pna, is a genus of orchids, composed of an estimated 16 species from Central America, northern South America and Trinidad. These species are medium-sized epiphytes with small ovoid pseudobulbs and 2 or more leaves. The generic name comes from the Greek Paphia, the name of Aphrodite of Cyprus. Most authorities consider the genus rare.

Species accepted as of June 2014:

 Paphinia benzingii Dodson & Neudecker – Ecuador
 Paphinia cristata (Lindl.) Lindl. – Trinidad, Colombia, Venezuela, the Guianas, northern Brazil 
 Paphinia dunstervillei Dodson & G.A.Romero – Venezuela
 Paphinia grandiflora Barb.Rodr. – northern Brazil 
 Paphinia herrerae Dodson – Ecuador
 Paphinia hirtzii Dodson – Ecuador
 Paphinia levyae Garay – Ecuador
 Paphinia lindeniana Rchb.f. – Colombia, Venezuela, Brazil, Peru
 Paphinia litensis Dodson & Neudecker – Ecuador
 Paphinia neudeckeri Jenny  – Ecuador, Colombia
 Paphinia posadarum Dodson & R.Escobar  – Ecuador, Colombia
 Paphinia rugosa  Rchb.f. – Colombia
 Paphinia seegeri G.Gerlach – Colombia
 Paphinia subclausa Dressler – Costa Rica
 Paphinia vermiculifera G.Gerlach & Dressler – Panama
 Paphinia zamorae Garay – Ecuador

Hybrids include:
Paphinia Majestic (P. cristata x P. herrerae)
Paphinia Memoria Remo Lombardi (P. herrerae x P. lindeniana) 
Gonginia (Gongora x Paphinia), an intergeneric hybrid

References

External links 

 International Plant Names Index (IPNI)

 
Stanhopeinae genera
Epiphytic orchids